The fifth season of King of the Hill originally aired Sundays at 7:30–8:00 p.m. (EST) from October 1, 2000 to May 13, 2001. The Region 1 DVD was released on November 22, 2005. The Region 2 DVD was released on February 26, 2007. The Region 4 DVD was released on April 28, 2008.

Production
The showrunner for the season was Richard Appel. Several of the show's original writers, such as Paul Lieberstein, left in the middle of the season.   Bobby and his friends growing up was a minor theme for the season.

Reception
In November 2000, David Bianculli of the New York Daily News labelled it as an "especially ambitious season", citing the episode "I Don't Want to Wait..." where the character Joseph hits puberty, commenting that he is "one of the first regular animated characters in a TV series to enter adolescence." Diane Werts of the Los Angeles Times wrote in February 2001 that, "King of the Hill is blissfully free of tired irony and sarcasm, while still sharp and contemporary. Young viewers are especially lovin’ it, landing the show in prime time’s top 20 among teens and adults 18 to 34." 

In 2008, Jaime Weinman of Canadian magazine Maclean's noted that during Season 5 and Season 6, co-creators Mike Judge and Greg Daniels had begun to be less involved with the show. He wrote, "the style of the show in those seasons was pretty similar to the style of the first few seasons, but a little broader and wilder", adding "there was some difference of opinion as to how well this approach was working. Judge, for one, has been pretty clear in interviews that he thought the show was going wrong in these seasons, making too much fun of Hank and reflecting the obsessions of the Harvard-educated writers who were running it."

Episodes

References

2000 American television seasons
2001 American television seasons
King of the Hill 05